Iron Butterfly is an American rock band formed in San Diego, California, in 1966. They are best known for the 1968 hit "In-A-Gadda-Da-Vida", providing a dramatic sound that led the way towards the development of hard rock and heavy metal music. Although their heyday was the late 1960s, the band has been reincarnated with various members with varying levels of success with no new recordings since 1975. Their second album, In-A-Gadda-Da-Vida (1968), remains a best-seller, and Iron Butterfly was the first group to receive an In-House platinum album award from Atlantic Records. Their music has found a significant impact on the international rock scenes, influencing numerous acts such as Black Sabbath, AC/DC, Rush, Alice Cooper, Mountain, Uriah Heep, Soundgarden, Stone Temple Pilots and Queens of the Stone Age.

History

Formation and Heavy (1966–1968)

The band formed in 1966 in San Diego. The original members were Doug Ingle (vocals, organ, formerly of Jeri and the Jeritones and Palace Pages, Iron Butterfly's forerunner), Jack Pinney (drums), Greg Willis (bass), and Danny Weis (guitar, also of Palace Pages). The group were soon joined by vocalist and tambourine player Darryl DeLoach. DeLoach's parents’ garage served as the site for their almost nightly rehearsals.

Jerry Penrod replaced Willis after the band relocated to Los Angeles in the summer of 1966. Pinney eventually left to return to school. Bruce Morse then replaced Pinney until Ron Bushy (from a group called the Voxmen) came aboard when Morse left due to a family emergency. A booking at Bido Lito's club in Hollywood soon led to regular appearances at the Galaxy Club and the Whisky a Go Go.

In early 1968, after the band signed a deal with Atco Records, an Atlantic Records subsidiary, the band's debut album Heavy was released. The group was signed by Atlantic's Charles Greene, who was co-producer of Heavy. All but Ingle and Bushy left the band after completing the album in the late summer of 1967. The two remaining musicians, faced with the possibility of the record not being released, quickly found replacements in bassist Lee Dorman and 17-year-old guitarist Erik Brann (also known as "Erik Braunn" and "Erik Braun") and resumed touring. In a 1986 interview with IB's fan club fanzine, The Butterfly Net, Brann stated that Jeff Beck, Neil Young, and Michael Monarch (who would go on to join Steppenwolf) had also expressed interest in joining the group to replace Weis.

After Brann was chosen, Penrod and DeLoach, uncomfortable with Brann's young age and frustrated with the time it was taking him to learn the band's repertoire, left the group after Weis did. Weis and Penrod went on to form the group Rhinoceros. In 1970 DeLoach formed Flintwhistle along with Jerry Penrod and Erik Brann. They performed live for about a year before breaking up.

Success with In-A-Gadda-Da-Vida and first breakup (1968–1971)

The 17-minute "In-A-Gadda-Da-Vida", the title track of Iron Butterfly's second album, became a top-30 hit (edited down to 2:52) in the U. S. The album was awarded a gold disc by the RIAA in December 1968. The album stayed on the Billboard charts for 140 weeks and ultimately sold over 30 million copies.

During this time, the band was represented by the William Morris Agency, which booked all their live concerts. Iron Butterfly played its first national tour in the summer of 1968 alongside Jefferson Airplane. By the end of 1968, the band was back in the studio at work on their next album. Iron Butterfly's third album, Ball,  was released in January 1969 and went gold, reaching #3 on the Billboard charts.

The band had been booked to play at Woodstock in August 1969 but got stuck at New York City's LaGuardia Airport. They explained their situation to the concert promoters and asked for patience. Their manager, however, sent a telegram demanding that Iron Butterfly be flown in by helicopter, whereupon they would "immediately" take the stage. After their set, they would be paid and flown back to the airport. According to drummer Bushy, "We went down to the Port Authority three times and waited for the helicopter, but it never showed up". Woodstock Production Coordinator John Morris claims he sent the manager a telegram reading: "For reasons I can't go into / Until you are here / Clarifying your situation / Knowing you are having problems / You will have to find / Other transportation / Unless you plan not to come." The acrostic formed by the first letter of each line in the telegram made it clear that the band was not welcome.

Erik Brann left the band after a final show in San Diego on December 15, 1969. Brann was frustrated with the band's unwillingness to move towards a harder rock sound. He was replaced in the line-up by two new musicians: guitarist/vocalist Mike Pinera (whose Blues Image had opened for Iron Butterfly's Vida tour) and guitarist Larry Reinhardt (from the Allman Brothers Band forerunner Second Coming). Both Pinera and Larry "Rhino" Reinhardt had been rehearsing secretly with the band since September 1969 after Brann had voiced his objections to continuing. In August 1970 Iron Butterfly released its fourth studio album Metamorphosis. The album managed to get into the Billboard top 20.

While Iron Butterfly was touring in Europe with Yes in early 1971, Doug Ingle announced his intention to leave the group. Ingle had grown tired of endless touring and wasn't totally on board with the band's new guitar-oriented blues and soul direction. The remaining four members cut the 45 rpm single, "Silly Sally" (with Bushy eventually being replaced on the record by a session drummer, at the producer's prompting). Putting forth a horn-based sound more characteristic of groups like Blood Sweat and Tears, the single failed to chart and proved to be their last recording before their mid-1970s reformation.

The band, with Ingle in tow, decided to play one final tour, pairing with Black Oak Arkansas. Pinera's band-mate from Blues Image, drummer Manny Bertematti, filled in for Bushy for most of the tour dates because of the latter's shoulder injury. The group then broke up after playing the tour's final show at Central Oregon Community College in Bend, Oregon on May 23, 1971. Another reason for the band not continuing at this time, according to a later interview by Pinera, was the U. S. Internal Revenue Service's effort to collect unpaid taxes.

Dorman and Reinhardt subsequently founded Captain Beyond.

Reunions (1974–2011)

In 1974 Brann was contacted by a promoter about reforming Iron Butterfly, so he reunited with Ron Bushy to form a new version of the group, signing with MCA Records and joined by Bushy's friend, bassist Philip Taylor Kramer, and keyboardist Howard Reitzes, a friend of Brann's who worked in a music store. Brann, who had done occasional lead vocals during Iron Butterfly's original run, served as the band's main lead vocalist this time. The album Scorching Beauty was released in January 1975 with Reitzes and Sun and Steel in October 1975 with Bill DeMartines replacing Reitzes. Both albums were criticized for bearing little resemblance to the original tone of the group and sold poorly compared to their earlier releases.

In 1977 the Bushy/Brann/Kramer/DeMartines grouping wound down after being plagued with bad management and tour dates that had started off in theaters but ended up in bars and clubs. Bushy, Kramer and DeMartines formed Magic and Lee Dorman put together a new IB lineup with Rhino that contained British singer Jimi Henderson, Larry Kiernan on keyboards, David Love on guitar and Kevin Karamitros on drums. This grouping toured mostly in the South. By 1978 the lineup was Dorman, Karamitros, Pinera and John Leimseider on keyboards.

In the late fall of 1978, a German promoter made an offer for the band to tour. The Metamorphosis lineup (Ingle, Bushy, Dorman, Pinera and Rhino) made preparations, but just before they were to depart for Germany, Dorman's father took ill and another bassist, Keith Ellis (formerly of Boxer), was brought in to cover for Dorman in case he had to suddenly return to the US. During the tour, Ellis died in Darmstadt, Germany on December 12, 1978.

After their return to the US, the Metamorphosis group played a few homecoming shows in early 1979, joined by Erik Brann for guest appearances. Later in 1979, Bushy returned to his other group, Gold, and the next IB lineup was: Mike Pinera, Lee Dorman, Doug Ingle, a returning John Leimseider and Dorman's Captain Beyond band-mate, drummer  Bobby Caldwell. Still later that same year, Bobby Hasbrook, from Hawaii, joined the band as lead guitarist and lead vocals alongside Dorman, Pinera, Caldwell and Leimseider.

IB's lineup was in a constant state of flux from late 1979 on as exhibited in the following groupings: Brann, Dorman, Leimseider, Caldwell and Hasbrook (1979); Pinera, Brann, Dorman, Hasbrook, Caldwell and Nathan Pino – keyboards (1979); Dorman, Brann, Hasbrook, Tim Kislan – keyboards, Zam Johnson – drums and Starz Vanderlocket – vocals, percussion (1980); Dorman, Rhino, Leimseider, Randy Skirvin – guitar, Jimmy Rock – drums and Luke – vocals, percussion (1981–1982); Pinera, Dorman, Rhino, Guy Babylon – keyboards and Jan Uvena – drums (1982) plus Pinera, Dorman, Rhino, Babylon and Bushy (1982).

On July 31, 1982, the Pinera, Dorman, Rhino, Babylon and Bushy lineup went into Music Sound Connection Studio in Studio City, California to record some material, none of which has ever been released.

At the tail end of 1982, Ingle returned to the fold once more as John Shearer (from Steve Hackett's band) came in on drums and percussionist Luke also rejoined since Bushy had taken a sales job outside of music for Makita Tools. Brann (who had guested at some shows during 1982) soon ended his association with the band at this time as well.

Pinera left again, as did Luke, in 1983 and IB worked on some more material in September of that year, with drummer Jerry Sommers playing on some tracks. But once again, nothing ever came of it.

Then Ingle, Dorman, Rhino and drummer Rick Rotante undertook the "Wings of Flight Tour" in early 1984, with Lenny Campanero (ex-Badfinger) replacing Rotante for more recording sessions at Salty Dog Studios in Van Nuys, California.

The "Legends Tour" took place in the fall of 1984 with Ingle, Dorman, Campanero and guitarist Steve Fister (later of Steppenwolf) and another Steppenwolf alumnus, bassist Kurtis Teel, took Dorman's spot for the "Phoenix Tour" in the fall of '85, which ended in late November, shortly after which, Teel suddenly died of a heart murmur on December 2. The group then disbanded once again due to managerial problems.

In the spring of 1987, Bushy and Pinera got back together to tour as Iron Butterfly for the "Wings of Flight 87" tour (Dorman was captaining a fishing boat, so was not available at this time) with Ace Baker (keyboards) and Kelly Reubens (bass). Tim Von Hoffman and Glen Rappold (guitar, bass) soon replaced Ace Baker and drummer Donny Vosburgh (who'd been in Thee Image with Pinera) guested at some of these 1987 shows and subbed for Bushy on others. But this was short-lived, as Bushy and then Brann both rehearsed different IB lineups in August and September of that year (see Lineups below) that never made it to the concert stage.
 
In December 1987 the "classic lineup" of Ingle, Brann, Dorman and Bushy got together at The Roxy Theatre to prepare for a thirty date tour of the East Coast in the winter and spring of 1988 that culminated with an appearance at Atlantic Records 40th Anniversary celebration at Madison Square Garden on May 14, 1988, alongside Led Zeppelin and many others.

After this, Brann and Dorman decided to continue on, bringing in Rhino, keyboardist Derek Hilland and drummer Sal Rodriguez (replaced by Kenny Suarez). They were joined by singer/frontman Steve "Mick" Feldman and backup singers JoAnne Kurman-Montana and Cecelia Noel also appeared with the band for a few shows in 1989, as well as another drummer, Doug Freedman, who subbed for Suarez in the fall of '89. The 1989 IB lineup of Brann, Dorman, Rhino, Hilland, Feldman and Suarez appeared at Woodstock '89, which took place in August 1989 twenty years to the day of and on the site of the original Woodstock concert of 1969 as a spontaneous celebration of the event's 20th anniversary.

In 1990 after Brann fell out with the others and left Iron Butterfly for good, Dorman, Rhino, Hilland and Suarez recorded an album with singer  Robert Tepper that was meant to be an IB album called We Will Rise but instead was shelved and eventually reworked into Tepper's 1996 solo album, No Rest For The Wounded Heart.

After the Tepper-led lineup failed to break through, Tepper left to continue his solo career and Dorman, Rhino and Bushy went back on the road in early 1993 with keyboardist Burt Diaz. 
    
Doug Ingle rejoined the band in July 1994. In the spring of 1997 the band did a tour of Europe with "classic era" members Ingle, Bushy and Dorman, along with Hilland and Barnett. A DVD of live performances from this tour was released in 2008. Hilland was dropped in 1997 and Ingle officially retired from performing in early 1999. Singer/keysman Damian Bujanda had a brief tenure, but after leaving for personal reasons, Larry Rust joined the band as vocalist/keyboardist from 1999 to 2005.

In 2001, after Dorman took ill, one of the band's road crew, Oly Larios, sat in on bass. 
  
Guitarist/vocalist Charlie Marinkovich joined the band in 2002. Originally from Seattle, Marinkovich had played with Randy Hansen and others.

Original vocalist Darryl DeLoach (born on September 12, 1947) died of liver cancer on October 3, 2002, at the age of 55.

On July 25, 2003, Erik Brann died of heart failure at the age of 52.

Derek Hilland returned to play keyboards for the group's 2003 dates when Larry Rust was not available.

Larry Rust parted ways with the band in 2005 and was replaced by German violinist, keyboardist, and composer Martin Gerschwitz, who had formerly worked with Lita Ford, Meat Loaf, Walter Trout, and most recently Eric Burdon and The Animals.

In early 2010, an announcement was made that Iron Butterfly would receive the Lifetime Achievement Award at the 20th Annual San Diego Music Awards, which took place on September 12, 2010. The award was presented by San Diego Mayor Jerry Sanders. Later the same year, Ray Weston (formerly of Wishbone Ash) came in to substitute on drums for Ron Bushy after he was sidelined by health issues.

In early 2012, Phil Parlapiano substituted for Martin Gerschwitz for a few shows when Gerschwitz was unable to play due to his own solo-tour schedule.

Deaths of Reinhardt and Dorman, and inactivity (2012–2014)
Former guitarist Larry "Rhino" Reinhardt died on January 2, 2012, at the age of 63, due to cirrhosis of the liver. Bassist Lee Dorman, who had a history of heart trouble, died on December 21, 2012, at the age of 70. Both Reinhardt and Dorman were also founding members of Captain Beyond.

Following Dorman's death, Iron Butterfly dissolved once more. Charlie Marinkovich revealed in 2013 that he had departed the band altogether and that Ron Bushy was very ill, shrouding the band's future in doubt. At times during his recovery in 2014, Ron Bushy entertained the idea of putting a new Iron Butterfly band together, possibly with Martin Gerschwitz returning on keyboards and lead vocals.

Third reunion/tribute band and death of Ron Bushy (2015–present)
In late 2014, reports surfaced of the band reforming, with a lineup consisting of Bushy, Mike Pinera, Doug Ingle, Jr. on keyboards and an unnamed bassist. However, this reformation did not come to fruition and in 2015 the band unveiled a lineup consisting of Bushy and returning guitarist Eric Barnett, along with new members Mike Green (percussion), Dave Meros (bass), Phil Parlapiano (keyboards) and Ray Weston (drums). Meros, Parlapiano and Weston had all previously played with Iron Butterfly as substitute musicians; Meros for Dorman (in 2006) Parlapiano for Gerschwitz (in 2012) and Weston for Bushy (in 2010) respectively.

At that time, Ron Bushy was still involved with Iron Butterfly, but was retired from performing due to his health concerns. 
This left Weston as the only active drummer in the band at all appearances from the 2015 reunion through the end of 2019. In the summer of 2018, Bushy made a rare guest appearance with the band at a gig in California. This turned out to be his first performance on stage with Iron Butterfly since 2012 and his very last one with the band.

Former Butterfly keyboardist Larry Rust died peacefully at his home near Los Angeles on November 25, 2016, at the age of 63. Founding bassist Greg Willis died on November 11, 2016. A tribute concert was staged November 30 at Nicky Rottens in El Cajon.

On January 15, 2020, the Official Iron Butterfly website and their booking agent announced the lineup of the band for 2020: Eric Barnett (guitar, vocals), Dave Meros (bass, vocals), Bernie Pershey (drums, percussion), Martin Gerschwitz (keyboards, vocals), with occasional guests or fill in musicians being Ron Bushy (drums, percussion), Ray Weston (drums, percussion) and Michael Thomas Franklin (keyboards).

On August 29, 2021 TMZ reported that Ron Bushy had died that morning at the UCLA Medical Center at the age of 79 after a battle with esophageal cancer, leaving him as the third member of the In-A-Gadda-Da-Vida lineup to die, following Erik Brann and Lee Dorman in 2003 and 2012 respectively, and Doug Ingle as the only surviving member of this lineup.

Personnel

Current
 Eric Barnett – guitar, vocals (1995–2002, 2015–present)
 Martin Gerschwitz – keyboards, vocals (2005–2012, 2018–present)
 Dave Meros – bass, vocals (2015–present; substitute – 2006)
 Bernie Pershey – drums (2020–present)

Former

 Doug Ingle – organ, vocals (1966–1971, 1978–79, 1983–1985, 1987–88, 1994–1999)
 Jack Pinney – drums, percussion (1966)
 Danny Weis – guitar (1966–1967)
 Greg Willis – bass (1966)
 Darryl DeLoach – tambourine, vocals (1966–1967)
 Bruce Morse – drums, percussion (1966)
 Jerry Penrod – bass, backing vocals (1966–1967)
 Ron Bushy – drums, percussion (1966–1977, 1978–79, 1982, 1987–88, 1993–2012; guest 2015–2021)
 Erik Brann – guitar, vocals (1967–1969, 1974–1977, 1978–79, 1979–80, 1982, 1987, 1987–1989)
 Lee Dorman – bass, vocals (1967–1971, 1977–78, 1978–1985, 1987–2012)
 Mike Pinera – guitar, vocals (1970–1972, 1978–1979, 1982, 1987, 1993)
 Larry "Rhino" Reinhardt – guitar (1969–1971, 1977–78, 1978–79, 1981–1984, 1988–1993)
 Philip Taylor Kramer – bass, keyboards, vocals (1974–1977)
 Howard Reitzes – keyboards, vocals (1974–1975)
 Bill DeMartines – keyboards, vocals (1975–1977, 1987)
 Kevin Karamitros – drums (1977–1978)
 Jimi Henderson – vocals (1977–1978)
 Larry Kiernan – keyboards (1977–1978)
 David Love – guitar (1977–1978)
 John Leimseider – keyboards (1978, 1979, 1981–1982)
 Keith Ellis – bass (1978)
 Bobby Caldwell – drums, percussion (1979, substitute 1984)
 Bobby Hasbrook – guitar, vocals (1979–1982)
 Nathan Pino – keyboards (1979)
 Zam Johnson – drums, percussion (1980)
 Tim Kislan – keyboards (1980)
 Starz Vanderlocket – percussion, vocals (1980)
 Luke – percussion, vocals (1981–1982, 1982–1983)
 Jimmy Rock – drums (1981–1982)
 Randy Skirvin – guitar, vocals (1981–1982)
 Guy Babylon – keyboards (1982–1983)
 Jan Uvena – drums, percussion (1982)
 John Shearer – drums (1982–1983)
 Jerry Sommers – drums, percussion (1983)
 Rick Rotante – drums, percussion (1983–1984)
 Lenny Campanero – drums (1984–1985)
 Steve Fister – guitar, backing vocals (1984–1985)
 Kurtis Teel – bass (1985)
 Kelly Reubens – bass (1987)
 Tim Von Hoffman – keyboards (1987)
 Glen Rappold – guitar, bass, vocals (1987)
 Ace Baker – keyboards (1987)
 Sal Rodriguez – drums (1987, 1988)
 Jim Von Buelow – guitar (1987)
 Bob Birch – bass (1987)
 Doug Jackson – guitar (1987)
 Lyle T. West – vocals (1987)
 Derek Hilland – keyboards, backing vocals (1988–1990, 1993–1997; substitute – 2003)
 Kenny Suarez – drums, percussion (1988–1992)
 Steve "Mick" Feldman – vocals (1988–1990)
 Robert Tepper – vocals (1990–1992)
 Burt Diaz – keyboards (1993)
 Denny Artache – guitar, vocals (1993)
 Doug Bossey – guitar (1994–1995)
 Damian Bujanda – keyboards, vocals (1999)
 Larry Rust – keyboards, vocals (1999–2005) 
 Charlie Marinkovich – guitar, vocals (2002–2012)
 Phil Parlapiano – keyboards, vocals (2015–2018, substitute – 2012)
 Michael Green – percussion, vocals (2015–2019)
 Ray Weston – drums, percussion (2015–2020; substitute – 2010, 2020)

Supporting musicians
 Manny Bertematti – drums, percussion (substitute – 1971)
 Donny Vosburgh – drums (guest – 1987)
 Doug Freedman – drums, percussion (substitute – 1989)
 JoAnne Kurman-Montana – backing vocals (live – 1989)
 Cecelia Noel – backing vocals (live – 1989)
 Oly Larios – bass (substitute – 2001)
 Ken Chalupnik – bass (substitute – 2006)

Lineups

Timeline

Discography

Studio albums

Live albums

Compilation albums
 Evolution: The Best of Iron Butterfly (1971)
 Star Collection (1973)
 Rare Flight (1988)
 Light & Heavy: The Best of Iron Butterfly (1993)

Box sets
 Unconscious Power: An Anthology 1967–1971 (2020)

EPs
 "Iron Butterfly Theme" b/w "Look for the Sun", "Possession"
 Radio EP: "Iron Butterfly Theme", "Possession" b/w "Get Out of My Life Woman", "Unconscious Power"
 "In-A-Gadda-Da-Vida", "Flowers and Beads" b/w "My Mirage"

Singles

Videography
In-A-Gadda-Da-Vida (Rhino Home Video, R3-2215) 1995
(Contained video performances of "Easy Rider" (3:21), "In-A-Gadda-Da-Vida" (17:03) and "Butterfly Bleu" (19:51))
Rock 'N' Roll Greats In Concert! (Passport Video) 2004
(Contained video performances of the full concert at Itchycoo Park in 1999)

Citations

General and cited references

External links

 
 Collectors website with discography 
 Iron Butterfly Performances
 [ Iron Butterfly All Music Guide Entry]
 
 

1966 establishments in California
Acid rock music groups
Articles which contain graphical timelines
Atco Records artists
Hard rock musical groups from California
MCA Records artists
Musical groups established in 1966
Musical groups from San Diego
Psychedelic rock music groups from California